Max Clark (born 3 October 1995) is a professional rugby union player for Dragons in the United Rugby Championship who plays at centre. He previously played for Bath in Premiership Rugby.

Clark was born in Bridgend to a Welsh mother and English father.

Club career
Clark made his league debut for Bath on 17 October 2015, in a win over Exeter Chiefs, having previously played in the Anglo-Welsh Cup.

In December 2016, Clark scored his first Aviva Premiership try in a victory against Saracens.

Ahead of the 2022–23 United Rugby Championship, Clark joined Welsh club Dragons RFC.

International career
Clark has represented England at Under-16 and Under-18 level. Clark played for the England Under-20 side that finished runners up to New Zealand in the final of the 2015 Junior World Cup, scoring the opening try of the game.

Clark turned down an approach from Wales to be a member of their 2017 summer tour.

References

External links
Bath Rugby Profile
Dragons Profile

1995 births
Living people
English rugby union players
Bath Rugby players
Rugby union centres
Rugby union players from Bridgend
People educated at Bryanston School
People educated at Dulwich College
English people of Welsh descent
Dragons RFC players